Thomas Dobson may refer to:

 Thomas Dobson (printer) (1751–1823), master printer most famous for having published the earliest American version of the Encyclopædia Britannica
 Thomas Dobson (rugby) (1872–1902), rugby union footballer who played for Bradford F.C. and England
 Thomas Dobson (politician) (1853–1935), British Member of Parliament for Plymouth, 1906–1910
 Tom Dobson (rugby union) (1871–1937), Scottish-born rugby union forward who played for Cardiff and Wales
 Tom Dobson (cricketer) (1901–1940), English cricketer
 Tom Dobson (golfer) (1903–1968), Scottish golfer